Coleophora thymi is a moth of the family Coleophoridae. It is found from Germany to Italy and Greece.

The larvae feed on Thymus species. They create a trivalved tubular silken case of 8–9.5 mm with a mouth angle of about 30°. The case is light brown and has a number of indistinct length lines. The mines are quite small at first, but later the leaves are completely mined out. Larvae can be found from autumn to June.

References

thymi
Moths of Europe
Moths described in 1942